Maria Sterk (born 5 June 1979, in Hallum) is a Dutch marathon speed skater.

In 2005, she finished in third position of the Essent Cup and on 11 February of that year she announced to attack the women's world hour speed skating record, which was held by Lilian van Tol at that time. On 30 March 2005, she broke the world record in the Thialf stadium of Heerenveen and set the distance at 36.441,26 metres. Starting with laps of 37 seconds she took an advantage of a minute over the former record before skating laps of 40 seconds. In the end her average laptime was 39.5 seconds, which was enough to break the record. The record set by van Tol was 34.507,30 metres.

Sterk finished second in the 2006 Five Days of the Greenery. She was unable to win any of the races, but finished in second position in two races and gained enough points to claim the second place in the final rankings behind Daniëlle Bekkering, but in front of Elma de Vries. She also managed to claim one second and two third positions at the Essent Cup 2006–07, which is still running. She is currently found at the third spot behind Bekkering and de Vries.

Records

Personal records

World records

References

1979 births
Dutch female speed skaters
Sportspeople from Friesland
People from Ferwerderadiel
Living people
21st-century Dutch women
20th-century Dutch women